John Nuttall may refer to:

John Nuttall (athlete), British Olympian
John Nuttall (boxer), Indian Olympian
John Nuttall (cricketer), English cricketer
John Nuttall (MP), for Tamworth (UK Parliament constituency)
John Mitchell Nuttall, English physicist

See also
Jack Nuttall, Australian rules footballer
L. John Nuttall, Latter Day Saints leader
L. John Nuttall (educator), university academic